Kęstutis Nakas is an American playwright, author, performer, director, and teacher whose work has been presented at the New York Shakespeare Festival, Yale Repertory Theatre, La Mama, Dixon Place, P.S. 122, St. Mark's Church in the Bowery, 8 BC, The Kitchen, Highways, and numerous other national venues.

Biography
Nakas was born in 1953 in the U.S. to Lithuanian emigrants. He was named after Kęstutis, a 14th-century monarch of Lithuania, a heritage which he describes as "...no joke. It's hard work. Like being an emotional verbose gesticulating Italian and a sullen depressed Scandinavian at the same time."<ref>One Lithuanian guy short prose by Kęstutis Nakas' in Lituanus</ref>

Nakas was active in New York's East Village performance scene and was Artistic Director of Gates of Dawn, which showcased cutting edge performers such as Holly Hughes. He has taught at New York University, UCLA, CUNY, and the University of New Mexico.

Nakas received his B.A. from Michigan State University's experimental Justin Morrill College and a M.F.A. from New York University.

His best-known piece is the 4-part historical comic farce When Lithuania Ruled the World. Parts I through III of the series combining Lithuanian history and mythology were produced in New York City in the 1980s and 1990s; Part IV was produced in Chicago in 2003.

According to The New York Times review of this play, "Mr. Nakas is a very clever subverter of all versions of history...Experiencing this dizzying spectacle is certainly different and quite exhilarating, perhaps like seeing all the operas of Wagner and Mussorgsky jammed together and staged in Grand Central Terminal at rush hour."

Other works

Kestutis is the founder of a monthly live art performance event at i^3 productions I^3 hypermediain Chicago. Originally called "Word Of Mouth," and now "Follow Spot," this event is a "laboratory for original performance and live experiments of any nature."

 FOLLOW SPOT PASSING OF THE HAT CEREMONY at().
 Follow Spot on Facebook at 
 Hunger and Lightning, play; New York Times review at().

Professorship
Nakas is currently Associate Professor of Theatre at The Theatre Conservatory of Chicago College of Performing Arts at Roosevelt University in Chicago.

Family
He is married to the actress Audra Budrys and have one son together.  
Kęstutis has two siblings, a brother, Al, and one younger sister, Ruta.

Acting
As an actor, Nakas briefly appeared in the soap opera All My Children''.

References

External links
 Roosevelt University Chicago College of Performing Arts
 
 http://www.i3hypermedia.com/reels/StickyMusicVideo.php Sticky Music Video—i^3 productions

Michigan State University alumni
University of New Mexico faculty
Roosevelt University faculty
University of California, Los Angeles faculty
City University of New York faculty
1952 births
Living people
20th-century American dramatists and playwrights
American people of Lithuanian descent
New York University alumni
New York University faculty
Writers from Chicago
Writers from New York City